Oysho is a Spanish clothing retailer specialising in women's homewear and undergarments. The company is part of the Inditex group and was founded in 1977 as Confecciones Noite, S.A. in Arteixo, A Coruña in Galicia. In 2000, the company changed its corporate name to Oysho España. Now the company is headquartered in Tordera, Barcelona in Catalonia.

The brand has 650 stores, in more than 44 countries around the world, among which 190 are in Spain.

In 2016, the brand opened its first store in Jakarta, Indonesia. The store is located at Plaza Indonesia.

In 2017, Oysho organized a women's race against breast cancer in several cities.

In 2019, the brand opened its first store in Singapore. The store is located at Jewel Changi Airport.

History 
Oysho started in September 2001, when Oysho opened its first 10 stores in Spain and Portugal. By the end of the year, the number reaches 27 stores. At this time, the brand already operates in 4 European countries: Spain, Portugal, Italy and Greece. In 2007 Oysho opened the market in Serbia, Russia, Romania, Qatar, Oman, Jordan, Hungary, France, Cyprus, Bahrain and Andorra, reaching 22 countries, including Mexico, Kuwait and the United Arab Emirates.

In 2011, Oysho celebrated its 10th anniversary and established itself as a brand by opening new and important markets in China, Egypt, the Dominican Republic, Guatemala, Morocco and Ukraine. Oysho carries out the redesign / restyling of the logo and, in September of the same year, opens its online sales website.

In 2012 the chain's new logistics center was inaugurated, located in Tordera (Barcelona) Spain with a 51,736m2 warehouse.

In 2015, the chain launched an online marketplace in China together with the Chinese e-commerce giant Alibaba and subsequently its online store.

Stores

The number of Oysho stores in each country:

Africa
 Egypt: 4
 Morocco: 3
 Tunisia: 2
 Algeria: 1
 Angola: 1
 Mozambique: 1

Americas
 Mexico: 53
 Colombia: 4
 Dominican Republic: 2
 Guatemala: 2
 El Salvador: 1
 Panama: 2
 Ecuador: 1
 Honduras: 1

Asia
 China: 88
 Saudi Arabia: 20
 United Arab Emirates: 8
 Indonesia: 4
 Lebanon: 5
 Kazakhstan: 5
 Kuwait: 4
 Qatar: 4
 Jordan: 2
 South Korea: 2
 Bahrain: 1
 Oman: 1
 Thailand: 1
 Singapore: 1

Europe
 Spain: 177
 Russia: 68
 Italy: 41
 Portugal: 36
 Turkey: 29
 Greece: 19
 Poland: 19
 France: 12
 Romania: 10
 Ukraine: 7
 Bulgaria: 6
 Cyprus: 5
 Serbia: 4
 Belgium: 3
 Croatia: 3
 Hungary: 2
 Andorra: 2
 Armenia: 1
 Azerbaijan: 1
 Belarus: 1
 Czech Republic: 1
 Georgia: 1
 Kosovo: 1
 Lithuania: 1
 Latvia : 2
 Luxembourg: 2
 Malta: 1
 Montenegro: 1
 North Macedonia: 1
 Slovakia: 1
 Sweden: 1
 Switzerland: 1

References

External links

Retail companies established in 1977
Companies based in Catalonia
Clothing brands of Spain
Lingerie brands
Inditex brands
Clothing retailers of Spain
Spanish companies established in 1977
Clothing companies established in 1977